PT Honda Prospect Motor (abbreviated HPM) is a subsidiary of Honda automobiles for production, marketing and export of passenger cars in Indonesia. Based in Jakarta, it is a joint venture company between Honda Motor Co., Ltd. (51%) and PT Prospect Motor (49%). Established on 15 February 1999, HPM replaced PT Imora Motor (stands for Istana Mobil Raya) as the sole distributor of Honda cars in Indonesia.

History 
Honda cars have been sold in Indonesia since 1968 through Prospect's affiliated sales company, PT Imora Motor. In 1975, Prospect began local consignment production of Honda automobiles, responding to Indonesian government policy to encourage local automobile production. Honda vehicle sales in 1997 totaled 6,872 units (up 7% over 1996) but declined by 83% in 1998, to 1,182 units, mainly due to the economic crisis that hit the Southeast Asian region.

In 1999, Honda Motor Co., Ltd. established a joint venture company called PT Honda Prospect Motor (HPM) on 15 February 1999. HPM merged Honda's Indonesian automobile businesses, which was previously conducted by four separate companies ranging across vehicle assembly, engine and component manufacturing, and wholesale distribution. HPM was capitalized at US$70 million, with 51% initially held by Honda's partner PT Prospect Motor and 49% by Honda Motor Co., Ltd.

Facilities 
HPM began local automobile production in 2003 after the establishment of its first manufacturing plant in Karawang, with the Stream as the first car produced. Prior to the establishment of Karawang plant, Honda assembled vehicles at the older facility owned by Prospect Motor in Sunter, North Jakarta. Its development was supported with Rp 700 billion investment. Initial annual capacity was set to reach 40,000 by 2004. The 100,000th car produced by the Karawang Plant rolled off the production line on January 29, 2007. HPM started exporting the Freed to Thailand and Malaysia from 2010 to 2014, and later the Brio to the Philippines and Vietnam from 2019.

To serve the increasing demand for Honda products in Indonesia, HPM opened a second manufacturing plant next to the existing plant on January 15, 2014 which increased its total annual production capacity from 80,000 units to 200,000 units. The first model produced was the Mobilio, which 86 percent of its parts were produced locally. With total investment of Rp 3.1 trillion, the second factory has total building area of 145,760 m2 with main production line facilities including welding area, engine assembly, frame assembly, and painting area. The factory also supported with including material supply area, stamping, plastic injection, plastic painting and vehicle quality.

On 27 February 2017, HPM celebrated one million automobile production milestone.

Models

Current

Discontinued 
 Honda Civic Hatchback (1980–1996, assembled locally; 2017–2021, imported from Thailand)
 Honda CR-Z (2012–2018, imported from Japan)
 Honda Freed (2009–2016, assembled locally)
 Honda Jazz (2004–2021, assembled locally from 2005)
 Honda Life (1973–1976, imported from Japan)
 Honda Odyssey (2005–2021, imported from Japan)
 Honda Stream (2003–2007, assembled locally)

References 

Car manufacturers of Indonesia
Honda
Manufacturing companies based in Jakarta
Vehicle manufacturing companies established in 1999
Indonesian companies established in 1999